Rapting is a Madang language of Papua New Guinea.

References

Hanseman languages
Languages of Madang Province